The Treo 180 is a dual-band GSM smartphone made by Handspring. Released in 2002, it was the first device in the Treo family. Internet access was available using the Blazer browser.

It features a full keyboard and shipped with Palm OS version 3.5.2H. The 180 has a 160x160 monochrome screen, 16 MB of internal memory and a 33 MHz Dragonball CPU. Two main models were produced, the 180 with a thumb-type keyboard and the 180g which used the Graffiti handwriting recognition software, both were flip form factor.

See also
List of Palm OS Devices
Palm Treo
Palm OS

References

Palm OS devices
68k-based mobile devices
Handspring mobile phones
Mobile phones with an integrated hardware keyboard